Rhotacism or rhotacization is a sound change that converts one consonant (usually a voiced alveolar consonant: , , , or ) to a rhotic consonant in a certain environment. When a dialect or member of a language family resists the change and keeps a  sound, this is sometimes known as zetacism.

The term comes from the Greek letter rho, denoting .

Albanian
  vs.  'the voice'
  vs.  'the knee'
  vs.  'Albania'
  vs.  'cheerful'
  vs.  'lost'
  vs.  'smiling'
  vs.   'broken'
  vs.  'touched'
  vs.  'amazed'
  vs.   'Albania'  (older name of the country)
  vs.  'burnt'
  vs.   'drunk'
  vs.   'baked'
   vs.    'wood'
   vs.   'did'
  vs.   'put'
  vs.   'caught'
  vs.   'dust'
  vs.   'happy'
  vs.   'love'

Aramaic
In Aramaic, Proto-Semitic n changed to r in a few words:

 bar "son" as compared to Hebrew בֵן ben (from Proto-Semitic *bnu)
 trên and tartên "two" (masculine and feminine form respectively) as compared to Demotic Arabic tnēn and tintēn, from Proto-Semitic *ṯnaimi and *ṯnataimi. Compare also Aramic tinyânâ "the second one", without the shift.

Basque
Aquitanian *l changed to the tapped r between vowels in Basque. It can be observed in words borrowed from Latin; for example, Latin caelum (meaning "sky, heaven") became zeru in Basque (caelum > celu > zeru; compare cielo in Spanish). The original l is preserved in the Souletin dialect: caelum > celu > zelü.

Finnish

Goidelic languages
In Manx, Scottish Gaelic and some dialects of Irish, a  cluster developed into , often with nasalization of the following vowel, as in Scottish Gaelic   ‘hill’.

Germanic languages

Some languages later changed all forms to r, but Gothic, an extinct East Germanic language, did not undergo rhotacism.

Note that the Modern German forms have levelled the rhotic consonant to forms that did not originally have it. However, the original sound can still be seen in some nouns such as Wesen, "being" (from the same root as war/waren) as well as Verlust, "loss" and Verlies, "dungeon" (both from the same root as verlieren/verloren).

Because of the presence of words that did not undergo rhotacisation from the same root as those that did, the result of the process remains visible in a few modern English word pairs:
 is and are (PGmc. *isti vs *izi)
 was and were (PGmc. *wesaną vs *wēz)
 the comparative and superlative suffixes -er and -est (PGmc. *-izô vs *-istaz) and derived words such as more and most (*maizô vs *maistaz), better and best (*batizô vs *batistaz), etc
 rise and rear (as in 'to bring up'; PGmc. *rīsaną vs *raizijaną)
 loss and forlorn (PGmc. *lusą vs *fraluzanaz)

English

German
The change also occurs in Mecklenburg dialects. Compare Borrem (Central Hessian) and Boden (Standard German).

Romance languages and Latin

Latin
Reflecting a highly-regular change in pre-Classical Latin, intervocalic  in Old Latin, which is assumed to have been pronounced , invariably became r, resulting in pairs such as these:

flōs — flōrem (Old Latin flōsem)
genus — generis (from *geneses, cf. Sanskrit janasas)
rōbus, rōbustus — rōbur, corrōborāre (verb from )
jūstus — de jūre (from de jouse)
est — erō (from esō)
gessī, gestō — gerō (from gesō)

Intervocalic s in Classical Latin suggests either borrowing (rosa) or reduction of an earlier ss after a long vowel or a diphthong (pausa < paussa, vīsum < *vīssum < *weid-tom). The s was preserved initially (septum) and finally and in consonant clusters.

Old Latin honos became honor in Late Latin by analogy with the rhotacised forms in other cases such as genitive, dative and accusative honoris, honori, honorem.

Another form of rhotacism in Latin was dissimilation of d to r before another d and dissimilation of l to r before another l, resulting in pairs such as these:

medius — merīdiēs (instead of *medi-diēs)
caelum — caeruleus (instead of *cael-uleus)

The phenomenon was noted by the Romans themselves:

Neapolitan
In Neapolitan, rhotacism affects words that etymologically contained intervocalic or initial , when this is followed by a vowel; and when  is followed by another consonant. This last characteristic, however, is not very common in modern speech.

LAT.  > Neap.   "tooth"
LAT.  > Neap.   "foot"
LAT.  > Neap.   (or ) "money"

Portuguese and Galician
Compare Spanish obligado (obliged), playa, plato, blanco, placer, plaza from Latin obligatus, plagia, platus, blancus (Germanic origin), placere (verb), platea.

The nonstandard patterns are largely marginalised, and rhotacism is regarded as a sign of speech-language pathology or illiteracy.

Romanesco Italian
Rhotacism, in Romanesco, shifts l to r before a consonant, like certain Andalusian dialects of Spanish. Thus, Latin altus (tall) is alto in Italian but becomes arto in Romanesco. Rhotacism used to happen when l was preceded by a consonant, as in the word ingrese (English), but modern speech has lost that characteristic.

Another change related to r was the shortening of the geminated rr, which is not rhotacism. Italian errore, guerra and marrone "error", "war", "brown" become erore, guera and marone.

Romanian
In Romanian, rhotacism shifted intervocalic l to r and n to r.

Thus, Latin caelum ‘sky; heaven’ became Romanian cer, Latin fenestra ‘window’ Romanian fereastră and Latin felicitas ‘happiness’ Romanian fericire.

For example, Latin bonus became Istro-Romanian bur: compare to standard Daco-Romanian bun.

Sicilian
Rhotacism is particularly widespread in the island of Sicily, but it is almost completely absent in the Sicilian varieties of the mainland (Calabrese and Salentino). It affects intervocalic and initial : cura from Latin 
caudam, peri from Latin pedem, 'reci from Latin decem.

Spanish
In Andalusian Spanish, particularly in Seville, at the end of a syllable before another consonant, l is replaced with r: Huerva for Huelva. The reverse occurs in Caribbean Spanish: Puelto Rico for Puerto Rico (lambdacism).

Other languages
Rhotacism (mola > mora, filum > fir, sal > sare) exists in some Gallo-Italic languages as well: Lombard (Western and ) and Ligurian.

In Umbrian but not Oscan, rhotacism of intervocalic s occurred as in Latin.

Sanskrit
In Sanskrit, words ending in -s (-สฺ) other than -as ([เสียงอะ] + สฺ) become -r (-รฺ) in sandhi with a voiced consonant:

naus (นอุสฺ) (before p, t, k) vs naur bharati (นอุรฺ ภรติ)
agnis (อคฺนิสฺ) (before p, t, k) vs agnir mata (อคฺนิรฺ มต)

That is not properly rhotacism since r and s are then simply allophones.

Turkic
Among the Turkic languages, the Oghur branch exhibits /r/, opposing to the rest of Turkic, which exhibits /z/. In this case, rhotacism refers to the development of *-/r/, *-/z/, and *-/d/ to /r/,*-/k/,*-/kh/ in this branch.

South Slavic languages
(This section relies on the treatment in Greenberg 1999.)

In some South Slavic languages, rhotacism occasionally changes a voiced palatal fricative  to a dental or alveolar tap or trill  between vowels:

moreš (Slovene, dialectal Serbo-Croatian) 'you can' from earlier možešь
kdor (Slovene) from earlier kъto-že

The beginning of the change is attested in the Freising manuscripts from the 10th century AD, which show both the archaism (ise 'which' < *jь-že) and the innovation (tere 'also' < *te-že). The shift is also found in individual lexical items in Bulgarian dialects, дорде 'until' (< *do-že-dĕ) and Macedonian, сеѓере (archaic: 'always'). However, the results of the sound change have largely been reversed by lexical replacement in dialects in Serbia and Bosnia from the 14th century.

Dialects in Croatia and Slovenia have preserved more of the lexical items with the change and have even extended grammatical markers in -r from many sources that formally merged with the rhotic forms that arose from the sound change: Slovene dialect nocor 'tonight' (< *not'ь-sь-ǫ- + -r-) on the model of večer 'evening' (< *večerъ). The reversal of the change is evident in dialects in Serbia in which the -r- formant is systematically removed: Serbian veče 'evening'.

See also
 Lambdacism, the related condition or phonetic shift with regard to the sound

References

Bibliography

Phonetics
Sound changes